The County of Ward is a county (a cadastral division) in the south-eastern corner of Queensland, Australia. The main urban area within the county is the city of the Gold Coast, and it also extends to include the southern parts of the West Moreton region centred on Beaudesert and Boonah.

History
Ward was first created by an Order in Council by the Governor of New South Wales on 30 December 1848. It was then described in the following terms:

The Stanley–Ward boundary was somewhat imprecise — the 28th parallel met the sea near Southport, but gazettals and newspaper reports in the Moreton Bay Courier of land sales in the 1850s noted land between the Logan and Albert rivers as being within Ward, and numerous reports from 1863 onwards identified Boyd, Moffatt and Logan parishes to be part of Ward.

Upon the separation of Queensland from New South Wales in 1859, the southern boundary of Ward became part of the southern boundary of the new colony. On 7 March 1901, the Governor of Queensland proclaimed new boundaries under the Land Act 1897, which were described as follows:

Parishes 
Like all counties in Queensland, Ward is divided into parishes. The parishes current LGA and mapping coordinates to the approximate centre of each location is as follows:

See also
 Cadastral divisions of Queensland

References

Ward
South East Queensland